Malacosoma incurva, the southwestern tent caterpillar moth, is a species of moth of the family Lasiocampidae. It was first described by Henry Edwards in 1882. It is found in south-western North America, including Arizona, New Mexico, Nevada and Utah.

The wingspan is about 27 mm.

The larvae feed on Populus fremontii, Salix and Prunus species.

Subspecies
Malacosoma incurva incurva
Malacosoma incurva discoloratum (Neumoegen, 1893)

Gallery

References

Moths described in 1882
Malacosoma